Lophocereus marginatus is a species of plant in the family Cactaceae. It is sometimes called Mexican fencepost cactus. It has columnar trunks that grow slowly to 12 feet (3.7 m) and may reach 20 feet (6.1 m) in height. Stems are 3 to 4 inches (9–10 cm) in diameter, with ribs 5 to 7 in (13–18 cm). Its central spine is about 3/8 inch (1 cm) in diameter with five to 9 radials and slightly yellowish in color. Its cuttings are sometimes used to create fences, as its spines are not as large or dangerous as some cacti.

Distribution
The species is native to Mexico. It is also found in U.S. states that border Mexico: Texas, New Mexico, Arizona, and Southern California.

References

NL Britton, JN Rose, (1909). The genus Cereus and its allies in North America.

Echinocereeae